Events from the year 1914 in Canada.

Incumbents

Crown 
 Monarch – George V

Federal government 
 Governor General – Prince Arthur, Duke of Connaught and Strathearn 
 Prime Minister – Robert Borden
 Chief Justice – Charles Fitzpatrick (Quebec) 
 Parliament – 12th

Provincial governments

Lieutenant governors 
Lieutenant Governor of Alberta – George H. V. Bulyea 
Lieutenant Governor of British Columbia – Thomas Wilson Paterson (until December 5) then Francis Stillman Barnard 
Lieutenant Governor of Manitoba – Douglas Colin Cameron  
Lieutenant Governor of New Brunswick – Josiah Wood 
Lieutenant Governor of Nova Scotia – James Drummond McGregor    
Lieutenant Governor of Ontario – John Morison Gibson (until September 26) then John Strathearn Hendrie 
Lieutenant Governor of Prince Edward Island – Benjamin Rogers 
Lieutenant Governor of Quebec – François Langelier
Lieutenant Governor of Saskatchewan – George W. Brown

Premiers 
Premier of Alberta – Arthur Sifton   
Premier of British Columbia – Richard McBride  
Premier of Manitoba – Rodmond Roblin  
Premier of New Brunswick – James Kidd Flemming (until December 17) then George Johnson Clarke 
Premier of Nova Scotia – George Henry Murray 
Premier of Ontario – James Whitney (until September 25) then William Hearst (from October 2)
Premier of Prince Edward Island – John Alexander Mathieson  
Premier of Quebec – Lomer Gouin  
Premier of Saskatchewan – Thomas Walter Scott

Territorial governments

Commissioners 
 Commissioner of Yukon – George Black 
 Gold Commissioner of Yukon – George P. MacKenzie 
 Commissioner of Northwest Territories – Frederick D. White

Events

January to June
 March 19 – The Royal Ontario Museum opens
 April 11 – Canadian Margaret C. MacDonald is appointed Matron-in-Chief of the Canadian Nursing service band and becomes the first woman in the British Empire to reach the rank of major.
 May 14 – First major discovery of oil in western Canada at Turner Valley
 May 20 – The Niagara Falls peace conference begins. Representatives from Argentina, Brazil, Chile and the United States met for diplomatic negotiations in order to avoid war between the United States and Mexico
 May 23 –  The Komagata Maru, a Japanese steamship which sailed from Japan to British Columbia carrying 376 passengers, is turned back from Canada under authority of exclusion laws prohibiting Asian immigrants. Most of the passengers returned to India.
 May 29 – Ocean liner  sinks in Gulf of St. Lawrence; 1,024 lives lost.
 June 19 – The Hillcrest mine disaster in Alberta kills 189 of 235, the worst mining disaster in Canadian history
 June 29 – 1914 Ontario election: Sir James Whitney's Conservatives win a fourth consecutive majority

July to December
 August 4 – World War I: United Kingdom declares war on Germany, meaning Canada, as a member of the British Empire, is in a state of war.
 August 14 – Canada's War Measures Act is passed suspending some civil rights in Canada during a crisis.
 September 9 – World War I: The creation of the Canadian Automobile Machine Gun Brigade, the first fully mechanized unit in the British Army
 September 25 – James Whitney, Premier of Ontario, dies in office
 October 1 – Edward VII Monument (Montreal) unveiled
 October 2 – William Hearst becomes Premier of Ontario
 October 3 – World War I: 33,000 Canadian troops depart for Europe, the largest force to ever cross the Atlantic Ocean at the time.
 December 17 – George J. Clark becomes Premier of New Brunswick replacing the retiring James K. Flemming

Sport 

March 19 – National Hockey Association's Toronto Hockey Club win their first and only Stanley Cup by defeating Pacific Coast Hockey Association's Victoria Aristocrats three games to none. All games were played at Toronto's Arena Gardens
December 5 – Toronto Argonauts win their first Grey Cup by defeating the University of Toronto Varsity Blues 14 to 2 in the 6th Grey Cup played at Toronto's Varsity Stadium

Full date unknown
 All-time high levels of immigration are ended by the war
 The Better Farming Train made its first tour of Saskatchewan.
 Canada suspends the convertibility of the dollar into gold
 Edmonton adopts a new numbered street and avenue pattern
 Ontario passes a worker's compensation act that provides all workers with funding in case of disability

Arts and literature

Births

January to March
 January 17 – Kurt Freund, physician and sexologist (d.1996)
 February 2 – Eric Kierans, economist and politician (d.2004)
 March 13 – W. O. Mitchell, writer (d.1998)

April to June
 April 2 – Edwin Alonzo Boyd, criminal and leader of the Boyd Gang (d.2002)
 April 11 
 Norman McLaren, animator and film director (d.1987)
 Robert Stanfield, politician and 24th Premier of Nova Scotia (d.2003)
 April 14 – Robert Bend, politician (d.1999)
 April 18 – David Smith, veterinarian
 May 3 – Ernest Smith, soldier and Victoria Cross recipient in 1944 (d.2005)
 May 9 – Hank Snow, country music artist (d.1999)
 May 15 – Angus MacLean, politician and 27th Premier of Prince Edward Island (d.2000)
 May 16 – Eric Coy, discus thrower and shot putter (d.1985)
 May 19 – Alex Shibicky, ice hockey player (d.2005)
 May 27 – Hugh Le Caine, physicist, composer and instrument builder (d.1977)
 June 16 – Lucien Rivard, criminal and prison escapee (d.2002)
 June 21 – William Vickrey, professor of economics and Nobel Laureate (d.1996)

July to December
 July 1 – Stephen Juba, politician and Mayor of Winnipeg (d.1993)
 July 6 – Viola Desmond, black civil rights advocate (d. 1965)
 July 7 – Harry Strom, politician and 9th Premier of Alberta (d.1984)
 July 10 – Joe Shuster, comic book artist, co-creator of Superman (& nephew of Frank Shuster) (d.1992)
 July 19 – John Kenneth Macalister, World War II hero (d.1944)
 July 24 – Ed Mirvish, businessman, philanthropist and theatrical impresario (d.2007)
 August 2 – Félix Leclerc, folk singer, poet, writer, actor and political activist (d.1988)
 August 14 – Francis Lawrence Jobin, politician and Lieutenant Governor of Manitoba (d.1995)
 September 12 – Janusz Żurakowski, fighter and test pilot, first test pilot of Avro Arrow (d.2004)
 October 14 – Michael D. Moore, film director, second unit director and silent-era child actor (d.2013)
 November 28 – Mud Bruneteau, professional ice hockey forward who played for the Detroit Red Wings (d.1992)
 December 10 – Frank Thurston, engineer
 December 25 – Charles-Noël Barbès, politician and lawyer (d.2008)
 December 26 – Crawford Gordon, businessman (d.1967)

Full date unknown
 Shlomo Hestrin, Canadian-born Israeli biochemist (d.1962)
 Kay Tremblay, actress (d.2005)

Deaths

 January 21 – Donald Alexander Smith, politician (b.1820) 
 January 27 – Daniel Woodley Prowse, lawyer, politician, judge, historian and essayist (b.1834)
 March 1 – Gilbert Elliot-Murray-Kynynmound, 4th Earl of Minto, Governor General of Canada (b.1845)
 March 7 – George William Ross, educator, politician and 5th Premier of Ontario (b.1841)
 March 9 – Robert Christie, Ontario businessman and politician (b. 1826)
 April 7 – Edith Maude Eaton, author (b.1865)

 May 2 – John Campbell, 9th Duke of Argyll, Governor General of Canada (b.1845)
 July 9 – Henry Emmerson, lawyer, businessman, politician, philanthropist and 8th Premier of New Brunswick (b.1853)
 July 27 – Archibald Blue, teacher, journalist, and civil servant (b.1840)
 September 25 – James Whitney, politician and 6th Premier of Ontario (b.1843)

See also
 List of Canadian films

Historical documents
Governor General assures British government that Canadian people will make every effort and sacrifice to maintain integrity and honour "of our Empire"

British government accepts Canada's offers of expeditionary force and 1 million 98-lb. bags of flour (latter will steady prices and relieve distress)

Before shipping out, professor says that war is good for nation's health

Prime Minister Borden speaks out against German "ideals of force and violence"

Chief Justice expresses Canada's loyalty, satisfaction and trust in Empire

Nellie McClung describes "The Women's Parliament" burlesque of attitudes toward women's suffrage

"The race problem is becoming a serious one in Canada" - Many examples of menial jobs held by workers of Asian origin in B.C. (Note: racial stereotypes)

MP says civilization best in British Empire and northern Europe and "Anglo-Saxon and kindred peoples" must meet threat to it from 340,000,000 Asiatics

College president advocates saving Saskatchewan agriculture with cooperatives

Nova Scotia premier urges farmers to increase tillage and yields to feed Britain and Europe

Testimony of Katzie chief to royal commission about conditions on their Fraser River reserves near Vancouver

"Practical business and moral benefit[...]both to employers and workers" - Senate committee witness advocates federal labour bureaus

Survivor's account of escaping passenger liner Empress of Ireland as it sank in St. Lawrence River

Newsreel footage of Empress of Ireland victims being returned to Quebec City, and one family's two lone survivors - godfather and his goddaughter

Canadian militia fatally shoot duck hunter from Buffalo, N.Y. on Niagara River

Editorial on foolish chances shippers take while sailing on Great Lakes

References

 
Years of the 20th century in Canada
Canada
Canada